Varsity View is one of the original neighbourhoods of the Charleswood community in Winnipeg, Manitoba, Canada, and also a part of the Assiniboine South neighbourhood cluster.

In 1946, there were less than a hundred houses in the neighbourhood, which was mostly forest and farm fields. The bulk of the construction took place after the city of Winnipeg amalgamated with the surrounding municipalities. From 1971 to 1980, nearly 390 homes were built, accounting for 35% of the total housing stock in community.

Demographics and crime
In 2006, the population of Varsity View was 2,600 people. The area is 92.5% White, 4.4% Aboriginal and 3.1% is made up of visible minorities.

Varsity View is a middle-class neighbourhood, with a median household income of $60,206, which is a bit higher than the cities at $49,790. There are 1,150 dwellings, 70.9% which are owned and the average dwelling is worth $185,484. 7% of these dwellings are in need of major repairs.

The crime rate is low in Varsity View. In 2012, the robbery rate and break and enter rate were both 115.4 per 100,000 residents. There were no auto thefts, however the attempted auto theft rate was 153.8 per 100,000 residents. There were no homicides, shootings or reported sexual assault in the area in 2012.

References

Neighbourhoods in Winnipeg
Charleswood, Winnipeg